Revadihal is a village in Dharwad district of Karnataka, India.

Demographics 
As of the 2011 Census of India there were 348 households in Revadihal and a total population of 1,874 consisting of 977 males and 897 females. There were 339 children ages 0-6.

References

Villages in Dharwad district